Ralph O. Ward Memorial Arena formerly McNeese Arena is a 5,000 seat multi-purpose arena located in the McNeese State Recreational Sports Complex in Lake Charles, Louisiana. It is named after Ralph O. Ward, who was head coach of the men's basketball team from 1952 to 1971. The arena is currently home of the men's and women's indoor track and field teams. The Department of Health & Human Performance and administration offices are also located in the building along with athletic facilities for students.

Arena history
The building opened in 1939 as an open-air arena for rodeos and livestock shows. A roof was later added and became the home venue for the McNeese State Cowboys basketball team from 1956 to 1971. The facility also held tennis matches and physical education classes.

The Intramural Recreation Complex opened in 1982. In 1990, the arena was renamed the Ralph O. Ward Memorial Arena in honor of the former McNeese State basketball head coach.

McNeese State Recreational Sports Complex
In 2001, the recreational sports complex was built. An addition was constructed and attached to the arena. The facility became known as the McNeese State Recreational Sports Complex and the arena became a part of the facility. 

The complex offers basketball, volleyball, racquetball and indoor track. The complex has an Olympic size indoor and outdoor swimming pool, a 200-meter indoor track, eight outdoor tennis courts, intramural playing fields, wellness center, and locker rooms.

References

External links
 Arena information

Basketball venues in Louisiana
College indoor track and field venues in the United States
Defunct college basketball venues in the United States
Indoor arenas in Louisiana
Indoor track and field venues in Louisiana
McNeese Cowboys basketball
McNeese Cowboys and Cowgirls track and field
Rodeo venues in the United States
Sports venues in Lake Charles, Louisiana
Swimming venues in Louisiana
Tennis venues in Louisiana
University and college student recreation centers in the United States
Buildings and structures in Lake Charles, Louisiana
Sports venues completed in 1939
1939 establishments in Louisiana